Wahpeton may refer to the following ships of the United States Navy:

 , a United States Navy tug in service from 1946, reclassified YTM-527 in 1962, and stricken in 1985
 , a United States Navy tug acquired in 1968 and sold in 1974

United States Navy ship names